Santa Teresita, officially the Municipality of Santa Teresita,  is a 5th class municipality in the province of Batangas, Philippines. According to the 2020 census, it has a population of 21,559 people.

History
On December 28, 1961, the barrios of Sambat, Sinipian, Bihis, Calayaan, Irukan and Cutang Cawayan from the municipality of Taal, Calumala, Tambo, Saimsim and Burol from the municipality of San Nicolas, and Pacifico and Sampa from the municipality of San Luis were separated and constituted into a new and separate municipality known as Santa Teresita, by virtue of Executive Order No. 454 signed by President Carlos P. Garcia. The new municipality was named after its patron saint, St. Therese of the Child Jesus. Ireneo Aquino was appointed as its first municipal mayor, serving until June 1962. In 1971, barangay Antipolo was established as a separate barangay out of barangay Sinipian, as well as barangay Cuta East, which was separated from barangay Cutang Cawayan.

Geography
Santa Teresita is located at  along the southern lakeshore area of Taal Lake. Its boundaries are San Nicolas in the north, San Luis on the south, Taal on the west and Taal Lake on the northeast.

According to the Philippine Statistics Authority, the municipality has a land area of  constituting  of the  total area of Batangas.

Barangays
Santa Teresita is politically subdivided into 17 barangays, with 3 classified as urban and 14 as rural

Climate

Demographics

In the 2020 census, Santa Teresita had a population of 21,559.

Economy

Gallery

References

External links

[ Philippine Standard Geographic Code]

Municipalities of Batangas
Populated places on Taal Lake
Establishments by Philippine executive order